Salvation Army bands have a long history in Australia, with the first established in 1881 in Adelaide, South Australia. By the late 1990s, Australia had 200 senior and 130 junior Salvation Army brass bands.

Bands 
The following are Salvation Army Bands based in Australia:

References

Australia East Territory
Australian brass bands
Salvationism in Australia
Australian music-related lists